King College of Technology (KCT) was established jointly by the founder Mr. J. Ilango and by the chairperson Mrs. Kala Ilango.  An ISO 9001 - 2008 Certified Institution approved by AICTE New Delhi, it is affiliated with Anna University of Technology, Chennai

Courses offered
Undergraduate courses

 B.E - Civil Engineering
 B.E - Computer Science Engineering
 B.E - Electronics & Communication Engineering
 B.E - Mechanical Engineering
 B.E - Electrical & Electronics Engineering
 B.E - Automobile Engineering

Postgraduate courses
 M.E - Computer Science & Engineering
 M.E - VLSI Design
 M.E - Power Electronics and Drives
 M.E - Manufacturing Engineering
M.E - Environmental Engineering
 MBA
 MCA

Computer centre
A fully centralized air conditioned computer lab with latest Intel core duo and core i3 processors is available with multimedia facilities.  The centre is provided with Digital Boards which are used both for teaching and to deliver expert lectures 24 hours Internet Facility.

References

Engineering colleges in Tamil Nadu
Colleges affiliated to Anna University
Education in Namakkal district
Educational institutions established in 2007
2007 establishments in Tamil Nadu